In mathematics, the Rainville polynomials  pn(z) are  polynomials introduced by  given by the generating function

.

References

Polynomials